Laal Paree is a 1991 Bollywood romance fantasy film directed by Hannif Chippa, starring Aditya Pancholi and introducing Jahnvi in the role of the mermaid.

Plot
Shankar falls in love with a girl, unaware of that she is a mermaid. Dr Jacob discovers this and tries every possible way to expose her, not knowing that she will encounter danger.

Cast
 Aditya Pancholi as Shankar
 Jahnvi as Mermaid Meenakshi
 Javed Jaffrey as Johny
 Gulshan Grover as Dr. Jacob
 Vikram Gokhale
 Rajendra Nath
 Kanan Kaushal
 Johnny Whisky
 Bandini Mishra

Soundtrack

References

External links
 

1991 films
Films scored by Nadeem–Shravan
1990s Hindi-language films
1990s romantic fantasy films
Films about mermaids
Indian romantic fantasy films
Films with underwater settings